The Barteau Bridge, also known as Shioc Road Bridge, is a four-arch limestone arch bridge in Bovina, Wisconsin built during 1905–06. It was added to the National Register of Historic Places in 2002 for its engineering significance.

The bridge brought a two-lane road over the Shioc River.  John W. Hayes prepared plans for the bridge; James P. Garvey, of Freedom, was contracted to build it, for $6,795.

The bridge was bypassed in 1979.

References

Road bridges on the National Register of Historic Places in Wisconsin
Bridges completed in 1906
National Register of Historic Places in Outagamie County, Wisconsin
Stone arch bridges in the United States
Buildings and structures in Outagamie County, Wisconsin
1906 establishments in Wisconsin